The Black Angel is a studio album by American jazz trumpeter Freddie Hubbard, recorded in 1969 and released in 1970. It was his fourth release on the Atlantic label and features performances by Hubbard, James Spaulding, Kenny Barron, Reggie Workman, Louis Hayes and Carlos "Patato" Valdes.

Reception
Al Campbell of AllMusic commented "Freddie Hubbard released The Black Angel in the same year as the landmark Miles Davis album Bitches Brew. It's obvious Hubbard wanted to appeal to the emerging crossover rock/jazz crowd of the era. The presence of bop, however, still permeated Hubbard's playing, unlike Miles who had long since dropped the form...  An enjoyable session leaving the impression Hubbard was preparing to take a different musical direction".

Track listing
All compositions by Freddie Hubbard except as indicated

 "Spacetrack" - 16:58  
 "Eclipse" - 8:19  
 "The Black Angel" (Kenny Barron) - 8:19  
 "Gittin' Down" - 6:40  
 "Coral Keys" (Walter Bishop Jr.) - 5:20

Personnel
Freddie Hubbard - trumpet, flugelhorn
James Spaulding - alto saxophone, flute
Kenny Barron - piano, electric piano
Reggie Workman - bass
Louis Hayes - drums 
Carlos "Patato" Valdes - conga, maracas

References

1970 albums
Freddie Hubbard albums
Atlantic Records albums